Raymond John Guth (May 29, 1924 – December 17, 2021) was an American film, stage and television actor.

Early years 
Guth was born on May 29, 1924, in Oil City, Pennsylvania. He studied acting at the Pasadena Playhouse while supporting himself Work nights at a morgue.

Career 
Guth originally performed in stage plays. In 1954 he was given an award as best actor by Theater Americana for his performance as Genesius in the play The Comedian. He made his film debut in 1956, appearing in the film The Flesh Merchant. Guth's first credited television appearance was in 1957 in the anthology series Alfred Hitchcock Presents. He continued to work with Hitchcock in film and television.

Guth made guest appearances in the television shows Wagon Train, The Virginian, Route 66, The High Chaparral, Daniel Boone, Tombstone Territory, Rawhide The Rifleman, Perry Mason, and Land of the Giants, and multiple appearances in Gunsmoke, Death Valley Days and Bonanza. He made two appearances in the sitcom television series Hazel. Guth's final appearances were in the television programs The Rookies, Happy Days, The Dukes of Hazzard, Little House on the Prairie, Hart to Hart, Moonlighting and Highway to Heaven.

Guth's film credits include The Bonnie Parker Story (1958), The Young Captives (1959), Operation Bikini (1963), The Hostage (1967), The Reivers (1969), Bad Company (1972), and Silver Streak (1976), starring Gene Wilder. His last film credit was for the 1982 film Some Kind of Hero.

Personal life 
Guth died on December 17, 2021, in La Verne, California, at the age of 97.

Filmography

Film

Television

References

External links 

Rotten Tomatoes profile

1924 births
2021 deaths
People from Oil City, Pennsylvania
Male actors from Pennsylvania
American male film actors
American male stage actors
American male television actors
20th-century American male actors
Western (genre) television actors